Edwin Angus Emberg (November 18, 1921 – March 28, 2007) was a Canadian professional ice hockey forward who played two playoff games in the National Hockey League for the Montreal Canadiens during the 1944–45 season, and scored one goal. The rest of his career, which lasted from 1942 to 1952, was mainly spent in the Quebec Senior Hockey League. He was born in Montreal, Quebec.

Career statistics

Regular season and playoffs

External links
 
Obituary at LostHockey.com

1921 births
2007 deaths
Boston Olympics players
Canadian ice hockey centres
Montreal Canadiens players
Montreal Royals (QSHL) players
Ottawa Senators (QSHL) players
Quebec Aces (QSHL) players
Ice hockey people from Montreal
Valleyfield Braves players